Sonic Highways is the eighth studio album by American rock band Foo Fighters, released on November 10, 2014, through Roswell and RCA Records. Similar to their previous album, Wasting Light (2011), it was produced by the band with Butch Vig. In writing the album's eight songs, singer and guitarist Dave Grohl traveled to eight cities across the United States to conduct interviews with musicians, recording engineers, record producers, and other individuals discussing each city's musical history, which he used as inspiration for the songs' lyrics. The band and Vig then traveled to a different recording location in each city to record the songs. Each track features contributions from one or more musicians with ties to that city's musical history. The process was filmed for a companion television series, Foo Fighters: Sonic Highways, which was broadcast on HBO in the months surrounding the album's release.

Background and writing
Despite initially announcing a break after supporting Wasting Light, Grohl later stated in January 2013 that the band had started writing material for an eighth studio album. On February 20, 2013, at the Brit Awards, Grohl said he was flying back to America the following day to start work on the next album. In an August 2013 interview with XFM, Grohl announced that their next album was slated for a 2014 release, saying: 
"Well, I’ll tell you, we have been in our studio writing and in the past few weeks we’ve written an album and we are going to make this album in a way that no-one’s ever done before and we’re pretty excited about it... It’s a little ways off – it’s not ready to happen right now – but I think next year is going to be a really big year for the Foo Fighters, without question."

According to lead guitarist Chris Shiflett, Grohl would finish the lyrics just before recording his vocals, the last part of each song. This time the compositions would drift away from "love letters and confused relationships" to deal with the feelings Grohl had regarding each city during production.

Recording

On September 6, 2013, lead guitarist Chris Shiflett posted a photo to his Instagram account that indicated 13 songs were being recorded for the album. Keyboardist Rami Jaffee recorded parts for three songs, one of which is entitled "In the Way." Butch Vig, who produced the band's prior album, Wasting Light, confirmed he produced Sonic Highways as well. On July 30, 2014, Vig revealed that the band had finished recording and mixing the new album and that it was slated to be released a month after the Sonic Highways TV series. In an August 2014 press release, Grohl spoke about the album, saying: "This album is instantly recognizable as a Foo Fighters record, but there's something deeper and more musical to it. I think that these cities and these people influenced us to stretch out and explore new territory, without losing our ‘sound’."

Packaging
The album artwork by Stephan Martiniere has a cityscape amalgamating landmarks of every town used for production – Seattle's Space Needle, the Hollywood Sign in Los Angeles – and a recurring motif of the number eight, marking both the Foo Fighters' eighth album and infinity (∞). The vinyl pressings of the album are packaged in nine different covers, depicting each of the eight cities and the "Forever" building shaped like the infinity symbol. Most retailers would not guarantee which cover the purchaser would receive, and album art is "randomly selected" for orders from the band's official website.

Promotion

On January 16, 2014, a picture was posted to the Foo Fighters Facebook page with several master tapes, some labeled "LP 8". On May 15, 2014, it was announced that the band's eighth album would be released in November 2014 and that the Foo Fighters would commemorate the album and their 20th anniversary with an HBO TV series directed by Dave Grohl entitled Foo Fighters: Sonic Highways. On August 11, 2014, it was announced that the album would be titled Sonic Highways and released on November 10, 2014.

Critical reception

At Metacritic, which assigns a normalized rating out of 100 to reviews from mainstream critics, the album received an average score of 68, based on 31 reviews indicating "generally favorable reviews". Stephen Thomas Erlewine of AllMusic says the album "celebrates not the coiled fury of underground rock exploding into the mainstream, the way the '90s-happy Wasting Light did, but rather the classic rock that unites the U.S. from coast to coast." Philip Cosores at Consequence of Sound stated "the album plays out more like a bonus feature, something that can enhance the series’ enjoyment or simply further inform the experience".

Patrick Doyle from Rolling Stone noted that some of the album's songs are among "the band's most ambitious moments yet". Stuart Berman of Pitchfork was more critical of the album, stating "Foo Fighters completely demystify their own creative process, effectively turning the Sonic Highways project into a glorified homework assignment—educational, perhaps, but laboriously procedural."

Commercial performance 
The album debuted at number two on the Billboard 200, with sales of 190,000 copies in the United States. As of September 2015, it has sold 490,000 copies in the US.

Track listing

Personnel
Credits adapted from the album's liner notes.

Band
Dave Grohl – lead and backing vocals, rhythm guitar, acoustic guitar, cymbals, EBow on "Subterranean", producer
Pat Smear – rhythm guitar, lead guitar, producer
Nate Mendel – bass guitar, producer
Taylor Hawkins – drums, backing vocals, producer
Chris Shiflett – lead guitar, "devil pickin on "Congregation", backing vocals on "In the Clear", producer

Additional musicians
Mark Braud – trumpet on "In the Clear"
Zac Brown – "devil pickin and backing vocals on "Congregation"
Gary Clark, Jr. – lead guitar on "What Did I Do?/God as My Witness"
Charlie Gabriel – clarinet on "In the Clear"
Ben Gibbard – backing vocals on "Subterranean"
Chris Goss – backing vocals on "Outside"
Drew Hester – percussion on "Congregation"; tambourine on "What Did I Do?/God as My Witness" and "I Am a River"
Ben Jaffe – tuba on "In the Clear"
Rami Jaffee – clavinet; organ; mellotron; piano; Wurlitzer electric piano; backing vocals on "In the Clear"; "space keys" on "I Am a River"
Ronell Johnson – tuba and backing vocals on "In the Clear"
Barrett Jones – EBow on "Subterranean"
Freddie Lonzo – trombone on "In the Clear"
Los Angeles Youth Orchestra – strings on "I Am a River"
Clint Maedgen – saxophone and backing vocals on "In the Clear"
Rick Nielsen – baritone guitar on "Something From Nothing"
Jim Rota – backing vocals on "In the Clear"
Peter Stahl – backing vocals on "The Feast and the Famine"
Skeeter Thompson – backing vocals on "The Feast and the Famine"
Tony Visconti – string arrangement on "I Am a River"
Joe Walsh – lead guitar on "Outside"
Kristeen Young – backing vocals on "I Am a River"

Production
Justin Armstrong – studio assistance (Robert Lang Studios)
Brandon Bell – studio assistance (Southern Ground Studios)
Charlie Bolois – studio assistance (Studio 6A, Rancho De La Luna, and Preservation Hall)
Dakota Bowman – studio assistance (Atomic Sound)
James Brown – recording engineer, mixing engineer

Reuben Cohen – mastering
Marcel Fernandez – studio assistance (Robert Lang Studios)
Kabir Hermon – studio assistance (The Magic Shop)
John Lousteau – studio assistance (Atomic Sound, Studio 6A, and Preservation Hall); backing vocals on "In the Clear"
Gavin Lurssen – mastering
Matt Mangano – studio assistance (Southern Ground Studios)
Greg Norman – studio assistance (Electrical Audio)
Jon San Paolo – studio assistance (Electrical Audio)
Matthias Schneeberger – studio assistance (Rancho De La Luna)
Chris Shurtleff – studio assistance (The Magic Shop)
Ben Simoneti – studio assistance (Southern Ground Studios)
Butch Vig – producer
Don Zientara – studio assistance (Inner Ear Studios)
Gersh Gershunoff - Drum Tech 
Artwork
Stephan Martiniere – cover illustration
Ringo – photographs
Andrew Stuart – photographs
Morning Breath, Inc. – art direction and design

Charts

Weekly charts

Year-end charts

Certifications

References

External links

2014 albums
Albums produced by Butch Vig
Foo Fighters albums
RCA Records albums
Concept albums